The Passenger – Welcome to Germany is a 1988 German drama film directed by Thomas Brasch. It was entered into the 1988 Cannes Film Festival.

Cast
 Tony Curtis – Mr. Cornfield
 Katharina Thalbach – Sofie
 Matthias Habich – Körner
 Karin Baal – Frau Tenzer
 Charles Régnier – Silbermann
 Alexandra Stewart – Mrs.
 George Tabori – Rabbiner
 Michael Morris – Donelly
 Ursula Andermatt – Rosa
 Guntbert Warns – Danner
 Fritz Marquardt – Herr Tenzer
 Birol Ünel – Baruch
 Gedeon Burkhard – Janko

References

External links

1988 films
1988 drama films
German drama films
West German films
1980s German-language films
Films set in Berlin
Films directed by Thomas Brasch
Holocaust films
Films about filmmaking
1980s German films